The 2021 European Junior Swimming Championships were held from 6 to 11 July 2021 in Rome, Italy at the Stadio Olimpico del Nuoto. The Championships were organized by LEN, the European Swimming League, and were held in a 50-meter pool. The Championships were for girls aged 14–17 and boys age 15–18.

Results

Boys

Girls

Mixed events

Team Trophy
Results:

Medal table

References

External links 
Results
Results book

European Junior Swimming Championships
European Junior Swimming Championships
International aquatics competitions hosted by Italy
European Junior Swimming Championships
European Junior Swimming Championships
2021 in youth sport
Sports competitions in Rome
2020s in Rome